Hansjürgen Schaefer (1930 – 1999) was a German musicologist and music critic.

Llfe 
Born in Freiberg, Schaefer studied music in Leipzig from 1952 to 1954 and musicology in Berlin from 1954 to 1957. From 1957 to 1960 he was editor of the Berliner Zeitung. From 1960 to 1973 he was editor-in-chief of the magazine Musik und Gesellschaft. From 1973 to 1991 he was the artistic director of the VEB Deutsche Schallplatten.

Publications 
 Musik in der sozialistischen Gesellschaft. (1967)
 Johann Sebastian Bach : 1685-1750. (1984)
 Orchestermusik. (1987)
 Johannes Brahms : ein Führer durch Leben und Werk. (1997)
 Joseph Haydn : Leben und Werk : ein Konzertbuch. (2000)

References

External links 
 
 

Musicologists from Berlin
20th-century German musicologists
German music critics
20th-century German journalists
Male journalists
German music journalists
1930 births
1999 deaths
People from Freiberg
Musik und Gesellschaft editors